Danbury Public Schools is a school district headquartered in Danbury, Connecticut.

In 2006 Eddie Davis retired from being superintendent.  Salvatore Pascarella succeeded Davis that year.

Schools
 High school
 Danbury High School

 Middle schools
 Broadview Middle School
 Rogers Park Middle School
 Westside Middle School Academy

 Elementary schools
 Western Connecticut Academy for International Studies Elementary Magnet School
 Ellsworth Avenue Elementary School
 Great Plain Elementary School
 Hayestown Elementary School
 King Street School
 Mill Ridge Primary School
 Morris Street
 Park Avenue
 Pembroke
 Shelter Rock
 South Street
 Stadley Rough

 Preschool
 Early Childhood Center

 Alternative schools
 Alternative Center for Excellence
 REACH/Endeavor

 Adult education
 Western Connecticut Regional Adult Education (WERACE)

References

External links
 

Education in Danbury, Connecticut
School districts in Connecticut